"Joe Knows How to Live" is a song written by Troy Seals, Max D. Barnes and Graham Lyle, and recorded by American country music artist Eddy Raven.  It was released in May 1988 as the second single from his compilation album The Best of Eddy Raven.  The song was Raven's fourth number one on the country chart.  The single went to number one for one week and spent a total of fifteen weeks on the country chart.

The song was previously recorded by the Nitty Gritty Dirt Band on their 1987 album Hold On.

Content
The song is told from the point of view of a blue collar worker envious of one of his co-workers, Joe. Joe's free-spirited ways are evidenced by Raven singing "Well I hate to admit it, but Joe sure knows how to live".  Joe tells his linemates of a trip to Mexico he is taking with Betty, a waitress at a diner that all are familiar with.  He later returns with photos and a hat he purchased in Mexico.

The trip Joe has taken was presumably done with ill-used sick days, as Raven says in the spoken-word fading end of the song, "well, they would have fired me if I'd have done something like that".  It also suggests that Joe is married, as Raven asks rhetorically "you think Joe's wife knows about that yet?" before the song completely fades.

Billy Warden of the Newport News Daily Press reviewed the song favorably, noting the "countrified Caribbean sway" and Raven's vocal tone.

Charts

Weekly charts

Year-end charts

References

1988 singles
1987 songs
Eddy Raven songs
Songs written by Troy Seals
Songs written by Max D. Barnes
Songs written by Graham Lyle
Song recordings produced by Barry Beckett
Nitty Gritty Dirt Band songs
RCA Records singles